Pete and Repeat is a 1931 American comedy film directed by Fatty Arbuckle.

Cast
 Bud Harrison
 Peenie Elmo

See also
 Fatty Arbuckle filmography

References

External links

1931 films
1931 comedy films
Films directed by Roscoe Arbuckle
Films with screenplays by George Jeske
Educational Pictures short films
American black-and-white films
American comedy short films
1930s English-language films
1930s American films